Dwight W. "Red" Morrison (born April 26, 1932) is a former American professional basketball player.

A 6'8" center from the University of Idaho, Morrison played in the National Basketball Association from 1954 to 1958 as a member of the Boston Celtics and St. Louis Hawks. He averaged 3.6 points and 5.3 rebounds in 155 career games.

Notes

1932 births
Living people
Amateur Athletic Union men's basketball players
American men's basketball players
Basketball players from California
Basketball players from Washington (state)
Boston Celtics draft picks
Boston Celtics players
Centers (basketball)
Idaho Vandals men's basketball players
Power forwards (basketball)
Sportspeople from Fresno, California
Sportspeople from Walla Walla, Washington
St. Louis Hawks players